Douglas Ahlstedt (born 16 March 1945, Jamestown, New York) is an American operatic tenor who had an international performance career with major opera houses from the 1970s through the 1990s. He currently teaches on the voice faculty at Carnegie Mellon University.

Early life and career
Born in Jamestown, New York, Ahlstedt attended and performed with the American Boychoir School in Princeton, NJ in his youth. He sang in his first opera while still a child, portraying the role of Miles in the United States premiere of Benjamin Britten's The Turn of the Screw with the New York College of Music in 1958. He earned a bachelor's degree in vocal performance from the State University of New York at Fredonia and a master's degree in vocal performance from the Eastman School of Music.

In 1972 Ahlstedt made his debut at the San Francisco Opera as Koby in the United States premiere of Gottfried von Einem's Der Besuch der alten Dame. That same year he made his debut at the Tanglewood Music Festival as the Boy in Ian Strasfogel's The Yes Men, and was also heard at Tanglewood that year as Soldato pretoriano in L'incoronazione di Poppea.

In 1973 Ahlstedt won the Metropolitan Opera National Council Auditions. He made his debut on the Met stage in September 1973 as Borsa in Rigoletto with Louis Quilico in the title role. He appeared at the Met in multiple roles, both leading and minor, over the next three seasons, including Benvolio in Roméo et Juliette, Brighella in Ariadne auf Naxos, Count Almaviva in The Barber of Seville, Danieli in I vespri siciliani, Edmondo in Manon Lescaut, Fenton in Falstaff, the First Prisoner in Fidelio, Froh in Das Rheingold, Gastone in La traviata, Lindoro in L'Italiana in Algeri, the Lover in Il tabarro, Major-domo in Der Rosenkavalier, Nathanael in The Tales of Hoffmann, a Priest in The Magic Flute, the Sailor's Voice in Tristan Und Isolde, and the Third Esquire in Parsifal.

In 1973, Ahlstedt appeared on the TV game show To Tell The Truth.(episode 1643). He received two of the four votes from the panel, and sang the Italian Tenor's aria from Der Rosenkavalier (with piano).

Later life and career
From 1975-1984 Ahlstedt was a resident artist at the Deutsche Oper am Rhein in Düsseldorf, Germany. He then became a resident artist at the Vienna State Opera for the next decade. He also made guest appearances at the Holland Festival (1977), the Grand Théâtre de Genève (1978), the Dutch National Opera (1979), the Zurich Opera (1980-1981), the Grand Théâtre de Bordeaux (1981), the Teatro dell'Opera di Roma (1982), the Hamburg State Opera (1982-1984), the Opéra d'Avignon (1983), the Badisches Staatstheater Karlsruhe (1984-1987), the Vlaamse Opera (1985), the Municipal Theatre of Santiago (1985 and 1987), the National Theatre Prague (1987), the Teatro di San Carlo (1988), the Teatro Municipal (Rio de Janeiro) (1989), the Bavarian State Opera (1990), and the Stuttgart State Opera (1991) among others. He also performed at the 1985 and 1987 Salzburg Festival as Anfinomo in Monteverdi's Il ritorno d'Ulisse in patria.

In 1979 Ahlstedt made his debut at the Opera Company of Philadelphia as Don Ramiro in La cenerentola with Maria Ewing in the title role. He also made guest appearances at the Florentine Opera in 1976 and the Dallas Opera in 1987.

In 1983 Ahlstedt returned to New York City to sing Idreno in a concert version of Semiramide at Avery Fisher Hall presented by the American Symphony Orchestra with June Anderson in the title role, Marilyn Horne as Arsace, and Samuel Ramey as Assace. That same year he returned to the Met after a seven-year absence as Iopas in Les Troyens. He appeared in several more operas at the Met over the next five years, including Count Almaviva, Fenton, Lindoro, and the title role in Pelléas et Mélisande. His final appearance on the Met stage was on April 14, 1988 as Ferrando in Così Fan Tutte.

References

1945 births
Living people
American operatic tenors
Carnegie Mellon University faculty
Eastman School of Music alumni
People from Jamestown, New York
State University of New York at Fredonia alumni
Winners of the Metropolitan Opera National Council Auditions
20th-century American male opera singers
Singers from New York (state)